Muhammad Ali Luqman (6 November 1898 – 24 March 1966) was a Yemeni lawyer, writer, and journalist. He established Faṫāṫ Al-Jazīrah, the first independent newspaper in Yemen.

References 

Yemeni lawyers
Yemeni writers
Yemeni journalists
1966 deaths
1898 births
Place of birth missing
Place of death missing
20th-century Yemeni journalists
20th-century Yemeni lawyers